Godalming Museum is a local museum in the town of Godalming, Surrey, England.

The museum covers the local history of the town and the surrounding area. The collections include paintings, ceramics, embroidery and architectural designs. The museum has works by  watercolourist Helen Allingham, watercolourist and engraver Myles Birket Foster, the garden designer Gertrude Jekyll, the architect Sir Edwin Lutyens, the landscape watercolourist and etcher Percy Robertson, and architect and china painter Hugh Thackeray Turner.

See also
 List of museums in Surrey

References

External links
 Godalming Museum website

Museums with year of establishment missing
Local museums in Surrey
Art museums and galleries in Surrey
Godalming